Welsh whisky is a whisky made in Wales. Whisky has been distilled in Wales since the Middle Ages, but production died out in the late nineteenth century. In the 1990s attempts were made to revive the practice, resulting in the establishment of Wales's first distillery in over one hundred years.

History
Wales has a long history of alcohol production, but distillation came in the Middle Ages. The first evidence of stills in Wales dates to the 4th century AD.

"The Great Welsh Warrior" Reaullt Hir is said to have distilled chwisgi from braggot brewed by the monks of Bardsey Island in AD 356. These monks then allegedly developed the art of distilling further. However this is unlikely. The name "Reaullt" is a High Medieval loanword from Anglo-Norman French, so this name would not have been used before the eleventh century.

The medieval Welsh stories of The Mabinogion mention fermentation but not distillation; the end of the "Mead Song" in a sixteenth-century manuscript of the sixth-century Tales of Taliesin mentions distillation, although mead is a fermented beverage.

Revival

Manufacturing of whisky in Wales declined during the nineteenth century, with the commercial development of liquor discouraged by the rise of the temperance movement. The last notable distillery was established by R. J. Lloyd Price in 1887 at Frongoch. His company, the Welsh Whisky Distillery Company, was not a success and was sold in 1900 to William Owen of Bala for £5000. The company was finally liquidated in 1910.

In the 1990s entrepreneurs attempted to revive distillation in the country. The first attempts entailed bottling Scottish blends in Wales as "Welsh whisky", but a lawsuit by Scotch distillers ended the enterprise. In 2000 the foundation of the Welsh Whisky Company (now known as Penderyn) was announced. A distillery was built at Penderyn in the Brecon Beacons National Park. Production commenced in 2000 and the finished product, the first whisky commercially produced in Wales for a century, went on sale in 2004.

In 2016 the Dà Mhìle distillery near Llandysul in west Wales bottled its first whisky, an organic single grain whisky.

In 2017, with two distilleries actively making and marketing whisky, Wales was officially recognised under European Union legislation as having a whisky industry. By February 2020, two more had begun operations: the Aber Falls distillery and Coles distillery.

The Aber Falls distillery in Abergwyngregyn, Gwynedd, commenced production in late 2017 and released its first whisky in 2021 after delaying the launch due to the Coronavirus.

In 2020, the Coles distillery produced the third single malt whisky in Wales at Llanddarog in Carmarthenshire, making it the fourth to begin production and the third to release whisky onto the market.

Distilleries

Aber Falls 
The Aber Falls distillery in Abergwyngregyn began production in 2017 and released its first whisky on 17 May 2021.

Anglesey Môn 
Anglesey Môn distillery was established in 2018 near Pentraeth on Anglesey.

Coles 
The Coles distillery, which also produces gin and vodka, is set in the Carmarthenshire countryside in the village of Llanddarog.

Dà Mhìle 
The name of the distillery was inspired by the initial bottling commissioned to Springbank to celebrate the millennium, (Dà Mhìle is Scottish Gaelic and translates to "two thousand"). The owners, John, Patrice and Paula came to Wales from Holland with dreams of setting up a centre for organic farming near Llandysul. In 2012 they opened the doors to the distillery on the farm, producing their first organic single malt.

In the Welsh Wind 
The 'In the Welsh Wind' distillery in Tan-y-groes, Ceredigion, was founded in January 2018. In 2021 it received permission to extend and develop the existing building and to construct a cask and grain store, which will allow it to complete all the steps of whisky production.

Penderyn 
The Penderyn distillery in Penderyn, Rhondda Cynon Taf was established in 2000 and was the first commercial distillery operating in Wales since the 19th century.

See also
 Food and drink industry of Wales
 Outline of whisky

References